John M. Allen (? – February 12, 1847) was a soldier and the first mayor of Galveston.

He was born in Kentucky. He fought in support of the Greek independence from Turkey as a volunteer in the United States Navy.  Lord Byron died in Missolonghi in Allen’s presence. He volunteered with the Texans, first with the Tampico Expedition in 1835, and with the Texas Army after he returned from Mexico late in the year. He received a commission as captain of an infantry unit and participated in the Battle of San Jacinto. He assumed command of a naval ship after independence and headed a recruiting mission in the United States until his release from service on December 2, 1836.  The Republic of Texas granted to him a league and labor for his military service.

Allen was the first mayor of Galveston, Texas, elected for the post first in 1839. He served consecutive one-year terms through 1846. He became a party to a charter war in 1840 when he transported the Galveston archives to his home. He withstood a challenge by Samuel May Williams and other persons with financial interests in the Galveston City Company. Allen commandeered two cannons to guard his home and the municipal archives, though they were returned to the city and Allen resumed his term as mayor.

Allen served as a United States Marshall from 1846 until his death the next year.

References 

Year of birth missing
1847 deaths
People of the Texas Revolution
People of the Republic of Texas
Mayors of Galveston, Texas
Army of the Republic of Texas officers
United States Marshals
Republic of Texas politicians
American people of the Greek War of Independence